Telepolis is a German Internet magazine, published by the  Heinz Heise Verlag since the beginning of 1996.

It was founded by journalists Armin Medosch and Florian Rötzer and deals with privacy, science, culture, internet-related and general politics and media. Other contributors include Mathias Bröckers, Gabriele Hooffacker or Burkhard Schröder.

Telepolis received the European prize for online journalism in the category "investigative reporting" in 2000 for its coverage of the Echelon project; in 2002, it received the Online Grimme prize.

It periodically releases special issues, the first printed edition (January 2005) being on "Aliens - how researchers and space travellers want to uncover their presence." One of the articles in this edition, perhaps the most daring, described the so-called theory of everything (TOE) proposed by Burkhard Heim and its alleged applications to spacecraft propulsion.  (Heim theory is not part of mainstream physics, and few physicists would describe it as a TOE.)  Others deal with SETI and exobiology.

References

External links
Telepolis

1996 establishments in Germany
Computer magazines published in Germany
Magazines established in 1996
Online computer magazines
German-language magazines